Yevhen Oleksandrovych Shcherban (18 January 1946 – 3 November 1996) was a Ukrainian businessman and politician. As a member of the Liberal Party of Ukraine, he was elected to the Verkhovna Rada from the Volnovakha electoral district in Donetsk Oblast.

Biography
Yevhen Shcherban was born in the village of Kostyantynivka in Krasnokutsk Raion on 18 January 1948. From 1972-77 he studied at the Mining Industrial College in Donetsk, and later at Donetsk National Technical University. Until 1988 he worked as a mining engineer. After the independence of Ukraine he established a cooperative organization "Progress" and later a corporation "ATON".

In the mid-1990s, Shcherban was among the richest people in Ukraine and a prominent and influential member of parliament for the Liberal Party of Ukraine.

Assassination
Shcherban and his wife Nadezhda (née Nikitina) were assassinated on a runway at Donetsk Airport on 3 November 1996 by several men posing as public force officers. Among the killers were Vadim Bolotskikh, Gennadiy Zangelidi and others. Prosecutors have stated the murder was intended to eliminate competition for control of natural gas industry. In 2002, eight men were arrested and tried for the murder. All of them were found guilty, with three receiving life sentences.

Related events
Coincidentally, the event took place soon after replacement of the Governor of Donetsk Oblast Volodymyr Shcherban (no relation to Yevhen) with the former Minister of Coal Industry of Ukraine Serhiy Polyakov and the appointment of Viktor Yanukovych to the position of a deputy chairman.

Previously, in December 1995, when Serhiy Polyakov was appointed to the ministerial position in Donetsk, the Industrial Union of Donbas (ISD) was established. Nominally headed by Serhiy Taruta, many saw the real leader of the Union as Yevhen Shcherban. Preceding that, in October 1995, Akhat Bragin was assassinated. Since then a number of assassinations of lesser ISD members took place from January to July 1996. However, the assassination of Shcherban became the most noticeable, because he was a People's Deputy of Ukraine.

Shcherban Affair

Former Ukrainian Prime Minister Pavlo Lazarenko was implicated in Shcherban's murder by the Prosecutor General of Ukraine Svyatoslav Piskun in January 2003. Piskun was fired from the office of Prosecutor General by two presidents of Ukraine, Leonid Kuchma and Viktor Yushchenko, but both dismissals were voided by the courts. Since late October 2011 former Prime Minister Yulia Tymoshenko has also been implicated, particularly by the First Deputy Prosecutor General of Ukraine Renat Kuzmin. In late October 2011 Ukrainian prosecutors began investigating whether Tymoshenko and Lazarenko were involved in Shcherban's murder. On 4 April 2012 Shcherban’s son, Ruslan, gave a press conference in Kiev in which he implied he had new evidence in the case. The wife of a key witness in the case, Izabella Kyrychenko who is a citizen of the United States, had complained that she was imprisoned to force a statement from her husband. Arrested in late 2011, she was released after three months from detention in the Lukyanivska Prison on health grounds. Coincidentally, her husband, Petro Kyrychenko was at the time giving testimony in connection with the Shcherban murder. In 2012, the Pechersk District Court closed the case against Kyrychenko.

On 18 January 2013, Tymoshenko was notified that she was a suspect for the murders of Shcherban, his wife and two other people in 1996.

In 2020, Ruslan Shcherban took back the accusations he had made against Tymoshenko: “As an affected party I had the right to suspect anyone. I had to check it. I know today that Pavlo Lazarenko was the actual assassin's paymaster, and Yulia Tymoshenko had nothing to do with it.”

See also
 Cassette Scandal

References

1946 births
1996 deaths
People from Kharkiv Oblast
Donetsk National Technical University alumni
Liberal Party of Ukraine politicians
Second convocation members of the Verkhovna Rada
Assassinated Ukrainian politicians
Ukrainian murder victims
People murdered by Russian-speaking organized crime
People murdered in Ukraine
Deaths by firearm in Ukraine
November 1996 crimes
Massacres in Ukraine
Murder in Donetsk Oblast
Terrorist incidents in Donetsk Oblast
Mass murder in 1996
November 1996 events in Europe
1996 murders in Ukraine
Terrorist incidents in Europe in 1996
Terrorist incidents in Ukraine in the 1990s
Massacres in 1996